The 2014–15 FIS Snowboard World Cup was the 21st edition of the FIS Snowboard World Cup, organised by International Ski Federation. The FIS Snowboarding World Cup consisted of the parallel slalom, parallel giant slalom, snowboard cross, halfpipe, slopestyle and big air.

Calendar: Men

Parallel

Snowboard Cross

Big Air

Slopestyle

Halfpipe

Calendar: Ladies

Parallel

Snowboard Cross

Big Air

Slopestyle

Halfpipe

Calendar: Team events

Standings: Men

Parallel overall (PGS/PSL)

Standings after 9 races.

Parallel slalom

Standings after 5 races.

Parallel giant slalom

Standings after 4 races.

Snowboard Cross

Standings after 3 races.

Nations Cup

Standings after 21 races.

Freestyle overall (SBS/BA/HP)

Standings after 7 races.

Slopestyle

Standings after 3 races.

Big Air

Standings after 2 races.

Halfpipe

Standings after 2 races.

Standings: Ladies

Parallel overall (PGS/PSL)

Standings after 9 races.

Parallel slalom

Standings after 5 races.

Parallel giant slalom

Standings after 4 races.

Snowboard Cross

Standings after 3 races.

Nations Cup

Standings after 21 races.

Freestyle overall (HP/BA/SS)

Standings after 7 races.

Slopestyle

Standings after 3 races.

Big Air

Standings after 2 races.

Halfpipe

Standings after 2 races.

References

FIS Snowboard World Cup
FIS Snowboard World Cup
FIS Snowboard World Cup